Tzeli Hadjidimitriou (sometimes spelled Jelly Hadjidimitriou) Greek is a fine art photographer, cinematographer, travel writer from Lesbos, Greece. She is the author of six photography books, with work shown in galleries in Greece and abroad. She is also the author of guidebooks to the Greek islands of Kythira and Lesbos and has published articles about her global travels to South Korea, India, Jordan and other destinations in the Greek Press.

Biography

Tzeli Hadjidimitriou was born in Mytilene, Lesbos in 1962. Her ancestry goes back to immigrants from the Asia Minor, in a town near today's Ismir. Since 1986, she holds a degree in Economics from the University of Thessaloniki. In 1984, she received a diploma in Italian Language and Culture from the Istituto Italiano di Cultura in Thessaloníki and in 1986, followed with a master from Casa d'Italia in Athens making her an official translator for the Italian language (Greek-Italian). In 1986, she moved to Rome where she studied for two years Direction of Photography for the Cinema followed in 1985, by different seminars on cinema taught by Michelangelo Antonioni. The seminar attendance was sponsored by the Università Cattolica del Sacro Cuore in Milan. Back in Greece in 1988, she completed successfully the first course offered in Greece for film editing run in collaboration with the ERT.

She worked for ten years in television and in the cinema as movie stills photographer working for different Greek directors. Among other she worked for Theodoros Angelopoulos, Tassos Boulmetis, Giorgos Panousopoulos, Giorgos Tsemperopoulos, Dimitris Vernikos and Anna Kessissoglou. She contributes regularly to different newspapers and magazines among them Geotropio (Eleftherotypia), Elliniko Panorama, Elle Greece, National Geographic Greece, Cup, Coffee and Tea, Voyager. She also edits the publications containing her photographs.

Photographic books

All books are bilingual English and Greek although some are available with the dust cover only in one of the two languages:
  In Communion With Stone, The Rural Architecture of Lesvos |  Συνομιλώντας με τα Πνεύματα της Πέτρας, η Αγροτική Αρχιτεκτονική της Λέσβου Crete University Press Photographic album. Texts: N.Sifounakis, N.Stefanou, Ch.Hatzilias, Tzeli Hadjidimitriou. 
  Time fading into clouds |  O χρόνος χάθηκε στα σύννεφα. Texts from: N. Vatopoulos, N. Chronas, Tz. Hadjidimitriou, Metaichmio, 2003,    
  Kythera |  Kύθηρα. Crete University Press, 2000,  
  Urban Housing of the '30s ; Modern Architecture in Pre-war Athens | Σπίτια του '30, Mοντέρνα αρχιτεκτονική στην προπολεμική Aθήνα. Texts from: M. Kardamitsi, N. Meras, P. Nikolaidis, P. Tournikiotis, M. Philippidis, D. Philippidis, Nereus Editions, 1998, 
 39 Coffee Houses and a Barber's shop | 39 Kαφενεία και ένα Kουρείο. Texts from: A. Fasianos, F. Frangouli, G Chronas, E. Papataxiarchis, G. Nikolakakis, Th. Paraskevaidis, Crete University Press, 1997,  
 Sacred Water: The Mineral Springs of Lesvos | Tο Aγιο Nερό: Oι Iαματικές Πηγές της Λέσβου.  Texts from: G. Maniotis, G. Doukakis, Tz. Hadjidimitriou, 1996,

Travel guide books
 In search of Kythera and Antikythera A traveller’s guide about the island of Kythera and Antikythera; research, texts and photographs by Tzeli Hadjidimitriou. self publishing (English language), 2013 
 A girl’s guide to Lesbos A traveller’s guide about the island of Lesvos with an LGBT orientation; research, texts and photographs by Tzeli Hadjidimitriou. self publishing (English language), 2012 
  Ανεξερεύνητη Λέσβος  (Uncharted Lesvos), research, photography and text by Tzeli Hadjidimitriou, Road Editions, 2006. 
  Ανεξερεύνητα Αντικύθηρα, Κύθηρα (Unexplored Antikythera, Kythera), research, photography and text by Tzeli Hadjidimitriou, Road Editions, 2008.

Solo exhibitions
 Aura from the island of Sappho, at Zero, 798 Art Space, Beijing, China, 2016. The well known poet Lan Lan, presented at the opening of the exhibition, her latest collection of poems, “Sappho: A Loose Bouquet”  
 Lesvos, the island of hidden harmony, at Sismanogleio Megaro, Greek Consulate, Istanbul, Turkey, 2015.
 Time fading into clouds, at Choros Technis 24 Gallery, Athens, 04 - 31 October 2004.
 A Journey in Kythera, audio & video show at the Cultural Centre of Nea Smyrni, Athens, in cooperation with the network Mediterranean S.O.S., 2002.
The Sacred Water, at the Natural History Museum of the Lesvos Petrified Forest with pictures from the book. 2000.
 The Sacred Water and of 39 Coffee Houses and a Barber’s Shop, slide presentation of the two books at Petra, Lesvos, 1998.
 The colour of Greece, in the Municipal Gallery of Molyvos, Lesvos, 17–27 June 1997.
 La Grecia vista dalla finestra, (Greece seen from the window):
in Centro Culturale La Plaka (La Plaka cultural centre), Padova, Italy 11–30 November 1995.
in the Istituto Ellenico di Studi Bizantini e Postbizantini (Institute of Byzantine Studies), in Venezia, from 3 March 1996.

Group exhibitions
Dancing nudes at Al Iquando Gallery, Paris, France, 2009
mommy art ’08 – the artAZ sessions no 2, mommy, Athens, 2008
Presentation of the slide show Sacred Water at the Wind’s Hammam in cooperation with the network “Mediterranean S.O.S.”, Athens, 2008.
Once upon a time there was Penelope Delta, Athens College, Athens, 2006.
A Table, Skoufa gallery, Athens, 2005.
Aquarium, at Saint Nicolas Bay Hotel, Saint Nicolas, Crete, 2005.
Zoom on Greece, at Sismanogleio Building in Konstantinople, Turkey, 2004
 In conjunction with the Cheap Art Team different exhibitions in Athens, 2004.
A little blue...., at Saint Nicolas Bay Hotel, Saint Nicolas, Crete, 2004.
In Praise of the Olive organized by the Academy of Athens, 2004.
Joining the Girl Power Team and participating in the events organized in cooperation with the Greek Anticancer Society and the Municipality of Athens. 2003.
Participation in the Kythera Photographic Encounters, 2002.
Water of life, participation in the celebrations of the European Heritage Days, 2000.
2000 Tin Cans, at The Lithographer’s Workshop at Piraeus Street, Athens, 2000.
39 Coffee Houses and a Barber Shop, based on her book with the participation of several artists, at Psihari 36 Gallery, Athens, 2000.
Mediterranean, A Source of Life and Civilization, in cooperation with the network Mediterranean S.O.S. several Greek towns and Mediterranean countries, 1999.
Piraeus Street, Transformations of an Industrial Landscape, Athens, 1997.
Aegean Trajectories in Light and Time, Skopelos Photographic Centre, Skopelos, 1997.

Articles

Hadjidimitriou's works have been published by newspapers and magazines. They include;

 Kathimerini, (7 December 1998); (15 January 2001); (20 August 2006)
Ta Nea, (20 October 2004)
Eleftherotypia,(29 December 2003)
To Vima, on the publication of 39 Coffee Houses and a Barber's shop (1 March 1998)  (24 April 2000)
Dimokratis, (23 April 2007)

References

External links
Personal website
Some pictures from the books published by the artist
Some other pictures from the artist

1962 births
Greek photographers
Living people
Architectural photographers
Interior photographers
Nature photographers
Movie stills photographers
Greek women photographers
People from Mytilene